Look Upon a Star was an American live television series, hosted by Bess Myerson and produced by Joseph Cates. The series aired on two DuMont Television Network stations, WABD and WTTG, during 1947. The show also aired on WRGB-TV, the General Electric TV station in Schenectady, New York.

The show featured high school students, was one of television's earliest talent series, and was a 30-minute series broadcast on Tuesdays at 7:30pm ET. The Comet Candy Company was the sponsor. Look Upon a Star replaced Highway to the Stars (August to October 1947), and was itself replaced by Camera Headlines in January 1948.

Controversy
According to the November 1, 1947, edition of newspaper The Afro American, an episode in which an African-American male and a white female, both members of the Katherine Dunham dance troupe, appeared on Look Upon a Star. The couple performed a dance together on the show, which created a controversy, with more than 100 objecting letters being sent in.

In response, Joseph Cates, one of the producers of the series, was quoted as saying "as producers we exercise the democratic privilege of producing our own shows as we see fit. The prejudiced television viewer can exercise his democratic privilege of switching his dial off or to a different station".

Episode status
As with most DuMont series, no episodes are known to survive.

See also
List of programs broadcast by the DuMont Television Network
List of surviving DuMont Television Network broadcasts
1947-48 United States network television schedule
Eloise Salutes the Stars

Bibliography
David Weinstein, The Forgotten Network: DuMont and the Birth of American Television (Philadelphia: Temple University Press, 2004) 
Alex McNeil, Total Television, Fourth edition (New York: Penguin Books, 1980) 
Tim Brooks and Earle Marsh, The Complete Directory to Prime Time Network TV Shows, Third edition (New York: Ballantine Books, 1964)

References

External links
Look Upon a Star at IMDB
DuMont historical website

1947 American television series debuts
1948 American television series endings
Lost television shows
English-language television shows
Black-and-white American television shows
DuMont Television Network original programming
Talent shows